The Elgol Sandstone Formation is a geological formation in Scotland, part of the Great Estuarine Group. It spans the transition between the Bajocian and Bathonian stages of the Middle Jurassic. The lithology consists of clay rich sandstone interbedded with silty fissile mudstone.

References

Stratigraphy of the United Kingdom
Geology of Scotland
Bathonian Stage
Bajocian Stage